is a railway station in Nobeoka, Miyazaki, Japan.

Lines

Layout 
The station consists of two side platforms serving two tracks at grade with a siding branching off track 2. There is no station building but both platforms have weather shelters for waiting passengers. Access to the opposite side platform is by a footbridge.

Adjacent stations

History
In 1913, the  had opened a line from  northwards to Hirose (now closed). After the Miyazaki Prefectural Railway was nationalized on 21 September 1917, Japanese Government Railways (JGR) undertook the subsequent extension of the track which it designated as the Miyazaki Main Line. Expanding north in phases, the track reached Hyūga-Nagai which was established as the northern terminus on 29 October 1922. At the same time, JGR had been expanding its Hoshū Line south from  down the east coast of Kyushu, reaching its southern terminus of  just 9 km north of Ichitana by March 1922. The entire stretch of track was then renamed the Nippō Main Line. With the privatization of Japanese National Railways (JNR), the successor of JGR, on 1 April 1987, the station came under the control of JR Kyushu.

Passenger statistics
In fiscal 2016, the station was used by an average of 3 passengers (boarding only) per day.

See also
List of railway stations in Japan

References

External links 

Hyūga-Nagai  (JR Kyushu)

Railway stations in Miyazaki Prefecture
Railway stations in Japan opened in 1922
Nobeoka, Miyazaki